The Denzel automobile was an early competitor to Porsche in Vienna, Austria beginning in 1948.  Although some automobile historians have relegated this marque to the category of a builder of "specials", the Denzel was manufactured for approximately 7–8 years after 5 years of development with total output approaching 300 units ending in 1959 according to the biography of Wolfgang Denzel on the company web site.

Denzel achieved worldwide publicity with their stunning win of the 1954 Alpine Rally. Denzel only manufactured open roadsters, similar in style to the first post-war Porsche prototype.  Like the Porsche marque launched in the ashes of World War II, Denzel developed its own enhanced VW drivetrain components, and on occasion even used Porsche engines in some of its later models.  Earliest models used handcrafted steel bodies but switched to aluminum bodies in the mid-1950s.

Wolfgang Denzel was the owner of the Denzel Automobile Company located in Austria, which created the automobile. Today this is the Wolfgang Denzel AG, a Car dealership company.

External links

Wolfgang Denzel AG
Vintage European Automobiles

Car manufacturers of Austria
Auto dealerships